Preston is a village located in the Central Coast Council municipal area, near Upper Castra and Ulverstone in the North West region of Tasmania, Australia. In 2011, the village had an estimated population of 250.

History
Preston Post Office opened on 1 October 1896 and closed in 1981.

Geography
Preston is located within the Braddon Division. It is connected to the west by Upper Castra by Preston Road and Castra Road, which goes through the village of Leport and connects to the main road in Ulverstone. It is bounded on the east by the Wilmot River (see Wilmot Power Station). The weather of Preston is generally mild.

Preston Falls
Preston Falls is  a tall and slender  plunge waterfall located above the Gunns Plains.

Education
Preston Primary School is in the village but is now a private residence after being closed by the board of education in 1994 after an attempt by the community to save the school. however the nearest high school is Ulverstone High School. The Don College is the closest public college.

References

Localities of Central Coast Council (Tasmania)